Fred James Walters (September 4, 1912 – February 1, 1980) was a backup catcher in Major League Baseball who played briefly for the Boston Red Sox during the  season. He was signed by the Red Sox in 1937 out of Mississippi State University.

A native of Laurel, Mississippi, Walters was one of many players who only appeared in the majors during World War II. He was a .172 hitter (16-for-93) with two runs, two doubles, one stolen base, and five RBI without home runs in 40 games. In 38 catching appearances he posted a .993 fielding percentage (one error in 144 chances). His professional playing career extended for 11 seasons (1938–42; 1944–49). In June 1946, he abruptly became the player-manager of the Triple-A Louisville Colonels during the six-week suspension of skipper Nemo Leibold and led the squad to a sparkling 34–12 record. The following season, he piloted the Double-A Birmingham Barons to the Southern Association championship.

Walters left baseball after the 1950 season, which he spent as manager of the Chattanooga Lookouts, eventually became a sheriff in Mississippi,. and died in his hometown of Laurel at the age of 67.

See also
1945 Boston Red Sox season

References

External links
Baseball Reference
Retrosheet

1912 births
1980 deaths
Baseball players from Mississippi
Birmingham Barons managers
Birmingham Barons players
Boston Red Sox players
Chattanooga Lookouts managers
Chattanooga Lookouts players
Little Rock Travelers players
Louisville Colonels (minor league) managers
Louisville Colonels (minor league) players
Major League Baseball catchers
Mississippi State Bulldogs baseball players
Montreal Royals players
New Orleans Pelicans (baseball) players
People from Laurel, Mississippi
Rocky Mount Red Sox players
San Antonio Missions players
Scranton Red Sox players